The 1890 World Allround Speed Skating Championships took place at 3 and 4 January at the ice rink Museumplein in Amsterdam, Netherlands. It's an unofficial championship because the ISU was founded in 1892.

Four distances were skated at the World Championship, the ½ mile (805 meter), the 1 mile (1609 meter),  the 2 miles (3219 meter) and the 5 miles (8047 meter). One became champion if one won three of the four distances.

The Norwegian Adolf Norseng did not become World Champion because he only won two distances of the four. He skated the fastest ½ mile in qualifying but finished second in the final.

Allround results 

  * = Fell
 NC = Not classified
 NF = Not finished
 NS = Not started
 DQ = Disqualified
Source: SpeedSkatingStats.com

Rules 
Four distances have to be skated:
 ½ mile (805 m)
 1 mile (1609 m)
 2 miles (3219 m)
 5 miles (8047 m)

One could only win the World Championships by winning at three of the four distances, so there would be no World Champion if no skater won three distances.

The winner of the ½ mile was decided by a final of the best four skaters of the distance. If the same time was skated a skate-off is skated to decide the ranking.

Silver and bronze medals were not awarded.

References 

World Allround Speed Skating Championships, 1890
1890 World Allround
World Allround, 1890
World Allround Speed Skating Championships, 1890
January 1890 sports events
1890 in the Netherlands
19th century in Amsterdam
1890 in Dutch sport